My Son the Jazz Drummer! (subtitled Modern Jazz Versions of Jewish and Israeli Songs) is an album by drummer Shelly Manne performing jazz adaptations of traditional and contemporary Jewish music, recorded in 1962 and released on the Contemporary label. The album was re-released on CD in 2004 as Steps to the Desert.

Reception

The Allmusic review by Scott Yanow states: "The arrangements by Rogers, Feldman, Edwards and Lennie Niehaus turn the music into modern mainstream jazz circa 1962, looking toward hard bop and the funky soul jazz that was popular during the era. ... more successful than one might expect".

Track listing
 "Hava Nagila" (Traditional) - 3:04
 "Bei Mir Bistu Shein" (Sholom Secunda, Jacob Jacobs) - 4:10
 "Yussel! Yussel!" (Nellie Cassman, Samuel Steinberg) - 3:47
 "Zamar Nodad" (Traditional) - 3:43
 "Bokrei Lachish" (Regev, Admon) - 5:33
 "Tzena" (Issacher Miron) - 3:32
 "Exodus" (Ernest Gold) - 4:35
 "Di Grine Kuzine" (Abe Schwartz, Hyman Prizant) - 4:25
 "My Yiddishe Momme" (Jack Yellen, Lew Pollack) - 3:39
 "Orchah Bamidbar" (Zahavi, Karni) - 4:14

Personnel
Shelly Manne - drums
Shorty Rogers - trumpet, flugelhorn, arranger
Teddy Edwards - tenor saxophone, arranger
Victor Feldman - vibraphone, piano, arranger
Al Viola - guitar
Monty Budwig - bass 
Lennie Niehaus - arranger

References

1963 albums
Contemporary Records albums
Shelly Manne albums
Albums arranged by Shorty Rogers
Jewish music albums